Comaschi is an Italian surname. Notable people with the surname include:

Antonio Comaschi (born 1951), Argentine boxer
Luciano Comaschi (1931–2019), Italian footballer
, Italian actress

Italian-language surnames
Surnames of South Tyrolean origin